Frank O'Rear Moseley (April 22, 1911 – July 31, 1979) was an American football player and coach, baseball coach, and college athletics administrator.  He served as the head football coach at Virginia Polytechnic Institute and State University from 1951 to 1960, compiling a record of 54–42–4.  His best season at Virginia Tech came in 1954, when his team went 8–0–1.  Moselely was also the head baseball coach at the University of Kentucky (1939–1941, 1946, 1948–1950), tallying a mark of 60–55–1.  In addition, he served as the athletic director at Virginia Tech from 1951 to 1978, during which time he hired Jerry Claiborne, his successor as head football coach.  Moseley was born in Montgomery, Alabama and died on July 31, 1979. In 1979, Moseley was inducted into the Virginia Sports Hall of Fame. He was elected to the Virginia Tech Sports Hall of Fame as an inaugural member in 1982.

Head coaching record

Football

References

External links
 Virginia Sports Hall of Fame profile
 

1911 births
1979 deaths
American football halfbacks
Alabama Crimson Tide football players
Kentucky Wildcats baseball coaches
Kentucky Wildcats football coaches
Maryland Terrapins football coaches
Virginia Tech Hokies athletic directors
Virginia Tech Hokies football coaches
Players of American football from Montgomery, Alabama
Sportspeople from Montgomery, Alabama